Bascov is a commune in Argeș County, Muntenia, Romania. It is composed of eight villages: Bascov, Brăileni, Glâmbocu, Mica, Prislopu Mic, Schiau, Uiasca, and Valea Ursului.

The Liga III football club ACS Unirea Bascov is located here.

A massacre took place in Bascov in August 2022, when five members of the same family were killed by a relative.

References

Communes in Argeș County
Localities in Muntenia